The Special Constables Act 1914 (4 & 5 George V, c. 61; An Act to enable His Majesty, by Order in Council, to make regulations with respect to Special Constables appointed during the present war.) was a British act of parliament, given royal assent on 28 August 1914, weeks after the outbreak of the First World War. It enabled the monarch to make regulations by Orders in Council regarding special constables for the duration of that conflict under the Special Constables Act 1831 or a section of the Municipal Corporations Act 1882 or under similar legislation in Scotland and Ireland.

The Act waived the 1831 Act's requirement for a "tumult, riot, or felony" to have occurred or be imminent before special constables could be appointed, made any regulation made by those Orders in Council binding on those appointed as special constables and extended to special constables the gratuities and allowances for constables injured in the line of duty or dependents of constables killed in the line of duty from the Police Acts between 1839 and 1910.

The Act was later made permanent by the Special Constables Act 1923.

References

Police legislation in the United Kingdom
1914 in law
United Kingdom Acts of Parliament 1914
United Kingdom home front during World War I
Act 1914